Kolhar is a Taluk of vijayapura district in Bombay Karnataka, </ref> in the southern state of Karnataka, India. It is located in the Kolhar taluka of Bijapur district in Karnataka.

Demographics
 India census, Kolhar had a population of 16,568 <ref census 2011 with males 8,471 females 8097 > 

Kolhar was declared as a taluka in 2013.

KOLHAR is the taluk of vijaypura district with pin code - 586210

See also
Bijapur district

References

External links

Villages in Bijapur district, Karnataka